Neal Edelstein is an independent film producer and is known as an early technology adopter.

Biography

Early life
Neal Edelstein was born in Winnetka, Illinois, USA. He graduated from the New Trier High School.

Career
Edelstein began his film career in Los Angeles, California in the early 1990s. In 1997, he produced David Lynch's segment in the French film Lumiere and Company, shot with the original Lumiere brothers's camera. After completion of the film, Edelstein and Lynch became partners in The Picture Factory, where Edelstein produced The Straight Story and Mulholland Drive, as well as worked with Lynch to conceive and launch the website DavidLynch.com.

Later, Edelstein formed Macari/Edelstein Filmed Entertainment with New Line Cinema executive Mike Macari. Their first project together was the American remake of the Japanese horror film The Ring, followed by the sequel The Ring Two. Edelstein was instrumental in creating the viral marketing campaign for The Ring with director Gore Verbinski. Other film credits include Disney-distributed The Invisible, directed by David Goyer, and Shelter, starring Julianne Moore and Jonathan Rhys Meyers.

Additionally, Edelstein is the founder of Hooked Digital Media, a production company that delivers filmed stories for the mobile and tablet generation. In 2013 they released Haunting Melissa, a storytelling iOS app that rolls out new chapters and content of varying duration.

Filmography
Edelstein was a producer in all films unless otherwise noted.

Film

As director

As writer

Thanks

Television

References

Living people
People from Winnetka, Illinois
People from Los Angeles
Film producers from California
Film producers from Illinois
Year of birth missing (living people)
New Trier High School alumni